Cercocladia is a genus of moths in the subfamily Arctiinae.

Species
 Cercocladia novicia Draudt, 1915
 Cercocladia seitzi Draudt, 1931

References

External links
Natural History Museum Lepidoptera generic names catalog

Arctiinae